Kristijan Naumovski (born 17 September 1988) is a Macedonian international footballer who plays as a goalkeeper for Shkupi.

Club career 
Naumovski signed a two-year contract with Levski Sofia in the summer of 2014.

On 11 June 2017, HK Pegasus chairperson Canny Leung revealed that Naumovski would be leaving the club as his contract would not be renewed.

International career
He made his senior debut for Macedonia in a November 2009 friendly match against Canada and has earned a total of 6 caps, scoring no goals. His final international was a March 2015 friendly against Australia. The coach of North Macedonia, Blagoja Milevski has called him up for the 2022 Qatar World Cup qualification playoff after 7 years absence.

Career statistics

Club

National team

Honours

Club
Rabotnički Skopje
Macedonian Football Cup: 2008–09
Dinamo București
Cupa României: 2011–12
Supercupa României: 2012
Hong Kong Pegasus FC
Hong Kong FA Cup: 2015–16
Hong Kong Sapling Cup: 2015–16
Shkupi
 Macedonian First Football League:2021–22

References

External links
 
 
 Profile at LevskiSofia.info

1988 births
Living people
Footballers from Skopje
Association football goalkeepers
Macedonian footballers
North Macedonia under-21 international footballers
North Macedonia international footballers
FK Rabotnički players
FC Dinamo București players
PFC Levski Sofia players
TSW Pegasus FC players
Birkirkara F.C. players
Balzan F.C. players
Macedonian First Football League players
Liga I players
First Professional Football League (Bulgaria) players
Hong Kong Premier League players
Maltese Premier League players
Macedonian expatriate footballers
Expatriate footballers in Romania
Macedonian expatriate sportspeople in Romania
Expatriate footballers in Bulgaria
Macedonian expatriate sportspeople in Bulgaria
Expatriate footballers in Hong Kong
Expatriate footballers in Malta
Macedonian expatriate sportspeople in Malta
Hong Kong League XI representative players